The United Kingdom has a National Grid that covers most of mainland Great Britain and several of the surrounding islands, as well as some connectivity to other countries. The electrical sector supplies power at 50 Hz AC, and ~240 volts is supplied to consumers. In 2020 the electricity sector's grid supply came from 55% low-carbon power (including 24.8% from wind, 17.2% nuclear power, 4.4% solar, 1.6% hydroelectricity, 6.5% biomass), 36.1% fossil fuelled power (almost all from natural gas), and 8.4% imports. Renewable power is showing strong growth, while fossil fuel generator use in general and coal use in particular is shrinking, with historically dominant coal generators now mainly being run in winter due to pollution and costs, and contributed just 1.6% of the supply in 2020.

The use of electricity declined 9% from 2010 to 2017, attributed largely to a decline in industrial activity and a switch to more energy efficient lighting and appliances. By 2018 per capita electrical generation had fallen to the same level as in 1984.

In 2008 nuclear electricity production was 53.2 TW·h, equivalent to 860 kWh per person. In 2014, 28.1 TW·h of energy was generated by wind power, which contributed 9.3% of the UK's electricity requirement. In 2015, 40.4 TW·h of energy was generated by wind power, and the quarterly generation record was set in the three-month period from October to December 2015, with 13% of the nation's electricity demand met by wind. Wind power contributed 15% of UK electricity generation in 2017 and 18.5% in the final quarter of 2017. In 2019, National Grid announced that low-carbon generation technologies had produced more electricity than fossil generators for the first time in Britain.

History

National grid

The first to use Nikola Tesla's three-phase high-voltage electric power distribution in the United Kingdom was Charles Merz, of the Merz & McLellan consulting partnership, at his Neptune Bank Power Station near Newcastle upon Tyne. This opened in 1901, and by 1912 had developed into the largest integrated power system in Europe. The rest of the country, however, continued to use a patchwork of small supply networks.

In 1925, the British government asked Lord Weir, a Glaswegian industrialist, to solve the problem of Britain's inefficient and fragmented electricity supply industry. Weir consulted Merz, and the result was the Electricity (Supply) Act 1926, which recommended that a "national gridiron" supply system be created.
The 1926 Act created the Central Electricity Board, which set up the UK's first synchronised, nationwide AC grid, running at 132 kV, 50 Hz.

The grid was created with 4,000 miles of cables: mostly overhead cables, linking the 122 most efficient power stations. The first "grid tower" was erected near Edinburgh on 14 July 1928, and work was completed in September 1933, ahead of schedule and on budget. It began operating in 1933 as a series of regional grids with auxiliary interconnections for emergency use. Following the unauthorised but successful short term parallelling of all regional grids by the night-time engineers on 29 October 1937, by 1938 the grid was operating as a national system. By then, the growth in the number of electricity users was the fastest in the world, rising from three quarters of a million in 1920 to nine million in 1938.
It proved its worth during the Blitz when South Wales provided power to replace lost output from Battersea and Fulham power stations.
The grid was nationalised by the Electricity Act 1947, which also created the British Electricity Authority.  In 1949, the British Electricity Authority decided to upgrade the grid by adding 275 kV links.

At its inception in 1950, the 275 kV Transmission System was designed to form part of a national supply system, with an anticipated total demand of 30,000 MW by 1970. This predicted demand was already exceeded by 1960. The rapid load growth led the Central Electricity Generating Board (CEGB) to carry out a study of future transmission needs, completed in September 1960. The study is described in a paper presented to the Institution of Electrical Engineers by Booth, Clark, Egginton and Forrest in 1962.

Considered in the study, together with the increased demand, was the effect on the transmission system of the rapid advances in generator design, resulting in projected power stations of 2,000–3,000 MW installed capacity. These new stations were mostly to be sited where advantage could be taken of a surplus of cheap low-grade fuel and adequate supplies of cooling water, but these locations did not coincide with the load centres. West Burton with 4 × 500 MW machines, sited at the Nottinghamshire coalfield near the River Trent, is a typical example. These developments shifted the emphasis on the transmission system, from interconnection to the primary function of bulk power transfers from the generation areas to the load centres, such as the anticipated transfer in 1970 of some 6,000 MW from The Midlands to the Home counties.

Continued reinforcement and extension of the existing 275 kV systems were examined as  possible solutions. However, in addition to the technical problem of very high fault levels, many more lines would have been required to obtain the estimated transfers at 275 kV. As this was not consistent with the CEGB's policy of preservation of amenities, a further solution was sought. Consideration was given to both a 400 kV and a 500 kV scheme as the alternatives, either of which gave a sufficient margin for future expansion. A 400 kV system was chosen, for two main reasons. First, the majority of the 275 kV lines could be uprated to 400 kV, and secondly it was envisaged that operation at 400 kV could commence in 1965, compared with 1968 for a 500 kV scheme. Design work was started, and to meet the 1965 timescale, the contract engineering for the first projects had to run concurrently with the design. This included the West Burton 400 kV Indoor Substation, the first section of which was commissioned in June 1965. From 1965, the grid was partly upgraded to 400 kV, beginning with a 150-mile (241 km) line from Sundon to West Burton, to become the Supergrid.

With the development of the national grid and the switch to using electricity, United Kingdom electricity consumption increased by around 150% between the post war nationalisation of the industry in 1948 and the mid-1960s. During the 1960s growth slowed as the market became saturated.

On the breakup of the CEGB in 1990, the ownership and operation of the National Grid in England and Wales passed to National Grid Company plc, later to become National Grid Transco, and now National Grid plc. In Scotland the grid was already split into two separate entities, one for southern and central Scotland and the other for northern Scotland, connected by interconnectors. The first is owned and maintained by SP Energy Networks, a subsidiary of Scottish Power, and the other by SSE. However, National Grid plc remains the System Operator for the whole British Grid.

Generation

The mode of generation has changed over the years.
During the 1940s some 90% of the generating capacity was fired by coal, with oil providing most of the remainder.

The United Kingdom started to develop a nuclear generating capacity in the 1950s, with Calder Hall being connected to the grid on 27 August 1956. Though the production of weapons-grade plutonium was the main reason behind this power station, other civil stations followed, and 26% of the nation's electricity was generated from nuclear power at its peak in 1997.

During the 1960s and 70s, coal plants were built to supply consumption despite economic challenges. During the 1970s and 80s some nuclear sites were built. From the 1990s gas power plants benefited from the Dash for Gas supplied by North Sea gas. After the 2000s, renewables like solar and wind added significant capacity. In Q3 2016, nuclear and renewables each supplied a quarter of British electricity, with coal supplying 3.6%.

Despite the flow of North Sea oil from the mid-1970s, oil fuelled generation remained relatively small and continued to decline.

Starting in 1993, and continuing through the 1990s, a combination of factors led to a so-called Dash for Gas, during which the use of coal was scaled back in favour of gas-fuelled generation. This was sparked by political concerns, the privatisation of the National Coal Board, British Gas and the Central Electricity Generating Board; the introduction of laws facilitating competition within the energy markets; the availability of cheap gas from the North Sea and elsewhere and the high efficiency and reduced pollution from combined cycle gas turbine (CCGT) generation. In 1990 just 1.09% of all gas consumed in the country was used in electricity generation; by 2004 the figure was 30.25%.

By 2004, coal use in power stations had fallen to 50.5 million tonnes, representing 82.4% of all coal used in 2004 (a fall of 43.6% compared to 1980 levels), though up slightly from its low in 1999. On several occasions in May 2016, Britain burned no coal for electricity for the first time since 1882. On 21 April 2017, Britain went a full day without using coal power for the first time since the Industrial Revolution, according to the National Grid.

From the mid-1990s new renewable energy sources began to contribute to the electricity generated, adding to a small hydroelectricity generating capacity.

UK 'energy gap'

In the early years of the 2000s, concerns grew over the prospect of an 'energy gap' in United Kingdom generating capacity. This was forecast to arise because it was expected that a number of coal fired power stations would close due to being unable to meet the clean air requirements of the European Large Combustion Plant Directive (directive 2001/80/EC). In addition, the United Kingdom's remaining Magnox nuclear stations were to have closed by 2015. The oldest AGR nuclear power station has had its life extended by ten years, and it was likely many of the others could be life-extended, reducing the potential gap suggested by the current accounting closure dates of between 2014 and 2023 for the AGR power stations.

A report from the industry in 2005 forecast that, without action to fill the gap, there would be a 20% shortfall in electricity generation capacity by 2015. Similar concerns were raised by a report published in 2000 by the Royal Commission on Environmental Pollution (Energy – The Changing Climate). The 2006 Energy Review attracted considerable press coverage – in particular in relation to the prospect of constructing a new generation of nuclear power stations, in order to prevent the rise in carbon dioxide emissions that would arise if other conventional power stations were to be built.

Among the public, according to a November 2005 poll conducted by YouGov for Deloitte, 35% of the population expected that by 2020 the majority of electricity generation would come from renewable energy (more than double the government's target, and far larger than the 5.5% generated as of 2008), 23% expected that the majority will come from nuclear power, and only 18% that the majority will come from fossil fuels. 92% thought the Government should do more to explore alternative power generation technologies to reduce carbon emissions.

Plugging the energy gap
The first move to plug the United Kingdom's projected energy gap was the construction of the conventionally gas-fired Langage Power Station and Marchwood Power Station which became operational in 2010.

In 2007, proposals for the construction of two new coal-fired power stations were announced, in Tilbury, Essex and in Kingsnorth, Kent. If built, they would have been the first coal-fired stations to be built in the United Kingdom in 20 years.

Beyond these new plants, there were a number of options that might be used to provide the new generating capacity, while minimising carbon emissions and producing less residues and contamination. Fossil fuel power plants might provide a solution if there was a satisfactory and economical way of reducing their carbon emissions. Carbon capture might provide a way of doing this; however the technology is relatively untried and costs are relatively high. As of 2006 there were no power plants in operation with a full carbon capture and storage system, and as of 2018 the situation is that there are no viable CCS systems worldwide.

Energy gap disappears
However, due to reducing demand in the late-2000s recession removing any medium term gap, and high gas prices, in 2011 and 2012 over 2 GW of older, less efficient, gas generation plant was mothballed. In 2011 electricity demand dropped 4%, and about 6.5 GW of additional gas-fired capacity is being added over 2011 and 2012. Early in 2012 the reserve margin stood at the high level of 32%.

Another important factor in reduced electrical demand in recent years has come from the phasing out of incandescent light bulbs and a switch to compact fluorescent and LED lighting. Research by the University of Oxford has shown that the average annual electrical consumption for lighting in a UK home fell from 720 kWh in 1997 to 508 kWh in 2012. Between 2007 and 2015, the UK's peak electrical demand fell from 61.5 GW to 52.7.GW.

In June 2013, the industry regulator Ofgem warned that the UK's energy sector faced "unprecedented challenges" and that "spare electricity power production capacity could fall to 2% by 2015, increasing the risk of blackouts". Proposed solutions "could include negotiating with major power users for them to reduce demand during peak times in return for payment".

The use of electricity declined 9% from 2010 to 2017, attributed largely to a decline in industrial activity and a switch to more energy efficient lighting and appliances. By 2018 per capita electrical generation had fallen to the same level as in 1984.

In January 2019 Nick Butler, in the Financial Times, wrote: "costs of all forms of energy (apart from nuclear) have fallen dramatically and there is no shortage of supply", partly based on the reserve capacity auction for 2021–2022 achieving extremely low prices.

Production

Modes of production

In 2020, total electricity production stood at 312 TWh (down from a peak of 385 TWh in 2005), generated from the following sources:

Gas: 35.7% (0.05% in 1990)
Nuclear: 16.1% (19% in 1990)
Wind: 24.2% (0% in 1990), of which:
Onshore Wind: 11.1%
Offshore Wind: 13%

Coal: 1.8% (67% in 1990)
Bio-Energy: 12.6% (0% in 1990)
Solar: 4.2% (0% in 1990)
Hydroelectric: 2.2% (2.6% in 1990)
Oil and other: 3.3% (12% in 1990)

The UK Government energy policy had targeted a total contribution from renewables to achieve 10% by 2010, but it was not until 2012 that this figure was exceeded; renewable energy sources supplied 11.3% (41.3 TWh) of the electricity generated in the United Kingdom in 2012.
The Scottish Government has a target of generating 17% to 18% of Scotland's electricity from renewables by 2010, rising to 40% by 2020.

The gross production of electricity was 393 TWh in 2004 which gave the 9th position in the world top producers in 2004.

The 6 major companies which dominate the British electricity market ("The Big Six") are: EDF, Centrica (British Gas), E.ON, RWE npower, Scottish Power and Southern & Scottish Energy.

The UK is planning to reform its Electricity Market. It has introduced a capacity mechanism and a Contract for Difference (CfD) subsidised purchase to encourage the building of new more environmentally friendly generation.

Gas and coal
Electricity produced with gas was 160 TWh in 2004 and 177 TWh in 2008. In both years the United Kingdom was the fourth highest producer of electricity from gas. In 2005 the UK produced 3.2% of the world total natural gas; ranking fifth after Russia (21.8%), United States (18%), Canada (6.5%) and Algeria (3.2%). In 2009 the UK’s own gas production was less and natural gas was also imported.

Due to reducing demand in the late-2000s recession and high gas prices, in 2011 and 2012 over 2 GW of older, less efficient, gas generation plant was mothballed.

On several occasions in May 2016, Britain burned no coal for electricity for the first time since 1882. Due to lower gas prices, economy of coal plants is strained, and 3 coal plants closed in 2016. On 21 April 2017, the mainland grid burnt no coal to make electricity for the first complete 24 hour period. And in spring/summer 2020 from 10 April, the UK grid ran for 68 days, without burning any coal.

In August and September 2021, the UK had to restart coal plants, amidst a lack of wind, as power imports from Europe were insufficient to satisfy demand.

Nuclear power

Nuclear power in the United Kingdom generates around a quarter of the country's electricity as of 2016, projected to rise to a third by 2035. The UK has 15 operational nuclear reactors at seven plants (14 advanced gas-cooled reactors (AGR) and one pressurised water reactor (PWR)), as well as  nuclear reprocessing plants at Sellafield and the Tails Management Facility (TMF) operated by Urenco in Capenhurst.

Renewable energy

From the mid-1990s renewable energy began to contribute to the electricity generated in the United Kingdom, adding to a small hydroelectricity generating capacity. Renewable energy sources provided for 11.3% of the electricity generated in the United Kingdom in 2012, reaching 41.3 TWh of electricity generated. As of 2nd quarter 2017, renewables generated 29.8% of the UK's electricity.

Currently, the biggest renewable source of energy in the UK is wind power, and the UK has some of the best wind resources in Europe. The UK has relatively small hydroelectricity deployment and resources, although some pumped storage exists. Solar power is rapidly growing and provides significant power during daylight hours, but total energy provided is still small. Biofuels are also used as a significant sources of power. Geothermal is not highly accessible and is not a significant source. Tidal resources are present and experimental projects are being tested, but are likely to be expensive.

Wind power delivers a growing percentage of the energy of the United Kingdom and by the beginning of February 2018, it consisted of 8,655 wind turbines with a total installed nameplate capacity of over 18.4 gigawatts: 12,083 megawatts of onshore capacity and 6,361 megawatts of offshore capacity. This placed the United Kingdom at this time as the world's sixth largest producer of wind power. Polling of public opinion consistently shows strong support for wind power in the UK, with nearly three quarters of the population agreeing with its use, even for people living near onshore wind turbines. Wind power is expected to continue growing in the UK for the foreseeable future, RenewableUK estimates that more than 2 GW of capacity will be deployed per year for the next five years. Within the UK, wind power was the second largest source of renewable energy after biomass in 2013.

In 2014, Imperial College predicted that Britain could have 40% of electricity from solar power in sunny days by 2020 in 10 million homes compared to a half a million homes in start of 2014. If a third of households would generate solar energy it could equal 6% of British total electricity consumption.

Diesel
Britain has a number of Diesel farms for supplying high demand hours of the day, normally in the winter, when other generators such as wind farms or solar farms may happen to have low output. Many of the diesel generators run for fewer than 200 hours a year.

Power stations

Storage

The UK has some large pumped storage systems, notably Dinorwig Power Station which can provide 1.7 GW for over 5 hours, having a storage capacity of about 9 GWh.

As of May 2021, 1.3 GW of battery storage was operating in the United Kingdom, with 16 GW of projects in the pipeline potentially deployable over the next few years.

In December 2019, the Minety Battery Energy Storage Project started construction, located near Minety, Wiltshire  and developed by Penso Power. Chinese investment provided the finance and the China Huaneng Group is responsible for construction and operation. The designed capacity was 100 MWh and uses LiFePo4 battery technology. It started operation in July 2021. In 2020 Penso Power decided to expand the project by 50 MWh, which is expected to start operation later in 2021. It is the biggest storage battery facility in Europe.

Consumption

Lighting
The European Commission banned low efficiency general-purpose, non-directional incandescent lightbulbs from 2012, and similarly shaped higher-efficiency halogen bulbs were banned in 2018. A few specialised bulb types such as for use in ovens are exempt from the ban.

Export/import 

There are 2GW of undersea interconnections between the GB grid and northern France (HVDC Cross-Channel), a second 1 GW connection with France (IFA2), Northern Ireland (HVDC Moyle), the Isle of Man (Isle of Man to England Interconnector), 1 GW with the Netherlands (BritNed), 1 GW Belgium (NEMO Link), 1.4 GW with Norway (North Sea Link) and the Republic of Ireland (EWIC).

The export of electricity was 1–3% of consumption between 2004 and 2009. According to IEA the UK was the sixth highest electricity importer, importing 11 TWh, after Brazil (42 TWh), Italy (40 TWh), United States (33 TWh), Netherlands (16 TWh) and Finland (14 TWh).

There are also future plans to lay cables to link the GB grid with Iceland (Icelink) and Norway (Scotland–Norway interconnector).

The longest cable, North Sea Link, is 720-kilometre long to connect Blyth, Northumberland, north-eastern England, to Kvilldall, south-western Norway.

Pricing
The electricity market is deregulated in the UK, and the cost per MWh for much of the generated electricity is paid at the locational marginal price. The price is traded on a spot market APX Power UK owned by the APX Group.

Electricity billing

In the UK, an electricity supplier is a retailer of electricity. For each supply point the supplier has to pay the various costs of transmission, distribution, meter operation, data collection, tax etc. The supplier then adds in energy costs and the supplier's own charge.

Pollution

The UK historically had a coal-driven grid that generated large amounts of CO2 and other pollutants including SO2 and nitrogen oxides, leading to some acid rain found in Norway and Sweden. Coal plants had to be fitted with scrubbers which added to costs.

In 2019 the electricity sector of the UK emitted 0.256 kg of CO2 per kWh of electricity.

See also

 Energy in the United Kingdom
 Energy policy of the United Kingdom
 National Grid (Great Britain)
 Lists of power stations in the United Kingdom
 High-voltage substations in the United Kingdom

References 

 
Electric power generation in the United Kingdom
Tidal resources are present and experimental projects are being tested